Barqulong, also rendered as Bardqolong or Barqolong, may refer to:
 Barqulong-e Bajuli